Abdi Beyg (also Romanized as ‘Abdī Beyg; also known as ‘Abdī Beyk) is a village in Sumay-ye Jonubi Rural District, Sumay-ye Beradust District, Urmia County, West Azerbaijan Province, Iran. At the 2006 census, its population was 121, in 23 families.

References 

Populated places in Urmia County